The Blue Ridge Music Center is a music venue, museum, and visitor center on the Blue Ridge Parkway near Galax, Virginia. The center celebrates the music and musicians of the Blue Ridge Mountains through concerts, exhibits, and programs. The site is a partnership between the National Park Service and Blue Ridge Parkway Foundation.

See also
 List of music museums

Sources

External links 

Music museums in Virginia
Music archives in the United States
Music venues in Virginia
Music venues completed in 1985
Museums in Grayson County, Virginia
Music organizations based in the United States
Blue Ridge Parkway
1985 establishments in Virginia
Appalachian music
Old-time music
National Park Service museums